Amargasuchus is an extinct genus of crocodylomorph. It was a member of the Trematochampsidae, an enigmatic family of mesoeucrocodylians. Fossils have been found from the La Amarga Formation in Argentina and date back to the Barremian and Aptian stages of the Early Cretaceous. Amargasuchus inhabited a terrestrial paleoenvironment that existed during the Early Cretaceous in the Neuquén basin that was characterized by a system of braided rivers, lakes, and alluvial plains. Sauropod, abelisauroid, and stegosaurian dinosaurs have also been found existing in the Neuquén basin at this time.

The holotype was discovered in 1984 in association with the dicraeosaurid sauropod dinosaur Amargasaurus.

References

External links 
 Amargasuchus at the Paleobiology Database

Early Cretaceous crocodylomorphs of South America
Barremian life
Aptian life
Cretaceous Argentina
Fossils of Argentina
 
Fossil taxa described in 1988
Prehistoric pseudosuchian genera